Queen L.  (born 21 May 1986) was a chestnut Standardbred trotter by Crowntron out of Attila L. by Tibur.

Her most prestigious victories include the Swedish Trotting Derby (Swedish: Svenskt Travderby) (1990), Prix d'Amérique (1993) and Prix de France (1995). At the end of her career, the mare had earned US$2,383,158.

Pedigree

References

External links

Swedish standardbred racehorses
Individual mares
1986 racehorse births